And She Closed Her Eyes is the second studio album by Swedish singer-songwriter Stina Nordenstam. It was released on Telegram Records Stockholm in 1994.

Track listing

Personnel
Credits adapted from liner notes.

 Stina Nordenstam – vocals, guitar, production
 Erik Holmberg – keyboards, guitar, drums, percussion, production
 Mats Lindfors – guitar (6), recording, mix engineering
 Sara Hammarström – flute
 Martin Green – saxophone
 Johan Hörlén – saxophone
 Jocke Milder – saxophone
 Jon Hassell – trumpet
 Fleshquartet – strings
 Johan Norberg – guitar
 Jonas Arlert – guitar
 Popsicle – guitar, bass guitar, vocals
 Lars Danielsson – bass guitar
 Sten Forsman – bass guitar
 Simon Nordell – vocals
 Joakim Ljungberg Isaksson – vocals
 Carl Slettengren – vocals
 Christer Linder – vocals
 Kent (Gillström) Isaacs – vocals, instruments, co-production (6)

Charts

References

External links
 

1994 albums
Stina Nordenstam albums
East West Records albums